This article is about the insects found in Metropolitan France. For the insects in the French Overseas territories, see : List of insects of French Guiana, List of insects of French Polynesia, List of insects of Martinique, List of insects of Réunion, List of insects of Guadeloupe, List of insects of Mayotte.

Species include:
 beetles
 Lucanus cervus, the stag beetle
 Donacia brevitarsis and Donacia malinovskyi, leaf beetle of the genus Donacia

 flies
 Musca domestica, the house fly

 butterflies and moths
 List of butterflies of France
 List of Lepidoptera of France
 List of moths of France (A-C)
 List of moths of France (D-H)
 List of moths of France (I-O)
 List of moths of France

 Mantises
 Iris oratoria

 Odonates (dragonflies and damselflies)
 List of Odonata species of Metropolitan France

 stick insects
 Bacillus rossius
 Clonopsis gallica

See also 
 Fauna of Metropolitan France